Hyptis florida is a species of flowering plant in the family Lamiaceae. It is found only in Ecuador. Its natural habitat is subtropical or tropical moist lowland forests.

References

florida
Flora of Ecuador
Endangered plants
Taxonomy articles created by Polbot